Ruckle Provincial Park is a provincial park on Salt Spring Island, British Columbia, Canada. It has the largest provincial campground on the Gulf Islands. Partly protected by the park is a historic sheep farm founded by the Ruckle family.

External links

Ruckle Prov. Park, BC Parks
Ruckle Prov. Park, BritishColumbia.com

Provincial parks of British Columbia
Salt Spring Island
1974 establishments in British Columbia
Protected areas established in 1974